The Belgian Trotter, is a Belgian breed of trotting horse. It is used mostly for racing in harness to a sulky, but may also run in saddled trotting races.

History 

The Belgian Trotter originates from cross-breeding of local carriage and saddle horses with imported Thoroughbred stock, and so may also be called , "half-blood trotter". It has been influenced by the American Standardbred, the German Trotter and the French Trotter, to which it is closely similar, although it may be somewhat smaller and lighter.

Since 2009 the stud-book has been held by the Vlaamse Federatie voor Paardenwedrennen.

In 2012 total numbers were reported to be 1085.

References 

Horse breeds originating in Belgium